HMS Albemarle was a pre-dreadnought  of the Royal Navy, named after George Monck, 1st Duke of Albemarle. The Duncan-class battleships were armed with a main battery of four  guns and they were broadly similar to the s, though of a slightly reduced displacement and thinner armour layout. Albemarle was built between her keel laying in January 1900 and her completion in November 1903.

Albemarle had a fairly uneventful career. She spent her first years in service with the Mediterranean Fleet from 1903 to 1905, when she was transferred to the Channel Fleet. In 1907, she was reassigned to the Atlantic Fleet; in early 1910 she transferred to the Home Fleet, first as part of the 4th Battle Squadron and later the 6th Battle Squadron. She served with the Grand Fleet on the Northern Patrol during the early stages of the First World War. She was later dispatched to Murmansk in Russia for guard and icebreaking duties for most of 1916. On her return to England, she underwent a refit and was in reserve for the remainder of the war. Decommissioned in April 1919, she was scrapped in 1920.

Design

The Russian ships were fast second-class battleships, so William Henry White, the British Director of Naval Construction, designed the Duncan class to match the purported top speed of the Russian vessels. The Duncans proved to be disappointments in service, owing to their reduced defensive characteristics, though they were still markedly superior to the Peresvets they had been built to counter.

The Duncan-class battleships displaced  normally and up to  fully loaded. Her crew numbered 720 officers and ratings. The Duncan-class ships were powered by a pair of 4-cylinder triple-expansion engines that drove two screws, with steam provided by 24 Belleville boilers. The boilers were trunked into two funnels located amidships. This made Albemarle and her sisters the fastest battleships in the world for several years.

Albemarle had a main battery of four  40-calibre guns mounted in twin-gun turrets fore and aft. The ships also mounted a secondary battery of twelve  45-calibre guns mounted in casemates, in addition to ten 12-pounder  guns and six 3-pounder  guns for defence against torpedo boats. As was customary for battleships of the period, she was also equipped with four  torpedo tubes submerged in the hull.

Her conning tower had 12-inch-thick sides.

Operational history

Pre-World War I
HMS Albemarle, named for George Monck, 1st Duke of Albemarle, was laid down on 1 January 1900 at Chatham Dockyard, and launched on 5 March 1901, when Lady Kennedy, wife of Admiral Sir William Kennedy, Commander-in-Chief of the Nore, performed the christening. She was completed in November 1903. Albemarle was commissioned at Chatham Dockyard on 12 November 1903 for service as Flag extra, Rear Admiral, for the second division of the Mediterranean Fleet. In February 1905 she was transferred to the Channel Fleet to serve as 2nd Flagship for the fleet's deputy commander. She was transferred to the Atlantic Fleet on 31 January 1907, serving as 2nd Flagship there as well. Under Captain Robert Falcon Scotts command, she collided with the battleship  on 11 February 1907, suffering minor bow damage.

She became Flagship, Rear Admiral, at Gibraltar in January 1909 and went to Malta for a refit from May through August 1909. Her Atlantic Fleet service ended in February 1910. On 25 February 1910, Albemarle was recommissioned for service in the 3rd Division, Home Fleet, at Portsmouth. She was paid off at Portsmouth Dockyard for a refit on 30 October 1911; the refit lasted from January to December 1912. Her refit complete, Albemarle was recommissioned at Portsmouth to serve in the 4th Battle Squadron in the First Fleet there. On 15 May 1913, she was reduced to a nucleus crew and assigned to the 6th Battle Squadron, Second Fleet, to serve as a gunnery training ship.

World War I

However, plans also existed for the 6th Battle Squadron to be assigned to the Grand Fleet, and, when the war began, the Commander-in-Chief, Grand Fleet, Admiral Sir John Jellicoe, requested that Albemarle and her four surviving sister ships of the Duncan class (Cornwallis, Duncan, Exmouth, and Russell) be assigned to the 3rd Battle Squadron in the Grand Fleet for patrol duties to make up for the Grand Fleet's shortage of cruisers. Accordingly, the 6th Battle Squadron was abolished temporarily, and Albemarle joined the 3rd Battle Squadron at Scapa Flow on 8 August 1914, and worked with Grand Fleet cruisers on the Northern Patrol.

The following day, the German fleet raided Yarmouth; at the time, Albemarle and the rest of the 3rd Squadron were dispersed on the Northern Patrol, and were thus unavailable during the German attack. On 13 November 1914, the King Edward VII-class ships returned to the Grand Fleet, but Albemarle and the other Duncans stayed in the Channel Fleet, where they reconstituted the 6th Battle Squadron on 14 November 1914. This squadron was given a mission of bombarding German submarine bases on the coast of Belgium, and was based at Portland, although it transferred to Dover immediately on 14 November 1914. However, due to a lack of anti-submarine defenses at Dover, particularly after the harbour's anti-submarine boom was swept away in a gale, the squadron returned to Portland on 19 November 1914. The squadron was intended to guard against an attempt by the German fleet to land an invasion force in Britain.

The 6th Battle Squadron returned to Dover in December 1914, then transferred to Sheerness on 30 December 1914 to relieve the 5th Battle Squadron there in guarding against a German invasion of the United Kingdom. Between January and May 1915, the 6th Battle Squadron was dispersed. Albemarle left the squadron in April 1915 and rejoined the 3rd Battle Squadron in the Grand Fleet. She underwent a refit at Chatham Dockyard in October 1915. In November 1915, Albemarle was ordered to move to the Mediterranean with a division of the 3rd Battle Squadron that also included the battleships  (the flagship), Zealandia, and Russell. The ships left Scapa Flow on 6 November 1915, but encountered extremely heavy weather that night in the Pentland Firth. Albemarle, heavily loaded with spare ammunition, suffered severe damage early on 7 November in the rough seas, having her forward bridge washed away, killing all of her bridge personnel. Her forward superstructure was also badly damaged in the incident.

When her repairs were complete in December 1915, Albemarle was ordered to rejoin the Grand Fleet. In January 1916, Albemarle was detached from the Grand Fleet to serve in North Russia at Murmansk as a guard ship and as an icebreaker in the approaches to Arkhangelsk. At Murmansk, she also served as flagship of Senior Naval Officer, Murmansk. Albemarle returned to the United Kingdom in September 1916, paying off at Portsmouth to provide crews for anti-submarine vessels. She began a refit at Liverpool in October 1916, and upon its completion in March 1917 she went into reserve at Devonport Dockyard; her main-deck casemate 6-inch guns were removed and replaced with four 6-inch guns on her battery deck between September 1916 and May 1917. Albemarle was in reserve until April 1919, used as an overflow accommodation ship for the naval barracks at Devonport, and was attached to the Gunnery School in 1919. The ship was placed on the disposal list in April 1919 and on the sale list in August 1919. She was sold for scrapping to Cohen Shipbeaking Company on 19 November 1919 and arrived at Swansea for scrapping in April 1920.

Notes

References
 
 
 v

Further reading
 
 
 
 
 

 

Duncan-class battleships
Ships built in Chatham
1901 ships
World War I battleships of the United Kingdom
Maritime incidents in 1907
Maritime incidents in 1915
Rogue wave incidents
George Monck, 1st Duke of Albemarle